Danny Monico is an American filmmaker, director, writer and producer. Most recently, he produced a short film, A Father’s Newfound Feminism, which Jonathan Hamm narrated for the New Yorker Daily Shouts column.  Several of his narrative films have been screened on different notable platforms like PBS, The Montclair Film Festival, and the Manhattan Film Festival.

In 2019, Monico created a one-hour television program called Short Focus, which showcased five short films that blended discussions with the directors to further illuminate the process of filmmaking as well as the rewards of learning through their craft.

With a keen eye for documentary work, Monico finds inspiration in human stories while working with his wife, Jasmine Wang, on their web series, ‘Pursuit’; which follows individuals, entrepreneurs, and artists, in their quest for fulfillment.

He currently lives in Montclair, New Jersey and from 2017 - 2020 was the President of Scoundrel Films, a production house co-founded by Luke Parker Bowles. The two worked together at Open Road Media in New York City.  He now heads Incurrent Media.

Incurrent Media 
Monico is the president of Incurrent Media and has produced multiple branded films for clients like TED and MasterCard to capture the world's most important innovators and researchers of today.

Scoundrel Films 
Scoundrel Films is led by Monico and producer Luke Parker Bowles, who serves on the Board of The Montclair Film Festival.  Founded in 2017 Scoundrel's portfolio of projects includes feature films, commercials, TV shows, and short films.

Production credits 
A graduate of University of Massachusetts Amherst, Monico has worked with artists such as Robert Duvall and Keira Knightley and has received recognition for his film, Broken Wing, in various film festivals.

References

External links 
 Danny Monico Official Hompeage :: Filmmaker, Director, Writer, Producer
 Scoundrel Films Montclair, New Jersey
 Incurrent Media Montclair, New Jersey
 IMDB Daniel Monico, Director | Editor | Producer
 "Broken Wing" Short Film Official Website
 The Montclair Film Festival Screening of "Broken Wing"
 Danny Monico: Love for Shorts in 'Short Focus'
 MontclairFilm.org: 'Short Focus' Screening Preview
 Montclair Local: The Annex at 18 Label Studios Aims to Build Community
 Montclair Dispatch: Lights, Camera, Action! Scoundrel Films Comes to Frink Street in Montclair!

American filmmakers
American directors
American producers
American writers
People from Montclair, New Jersey
Year of birth missing (living people)
Living people